Gleditsia assamica is a species of flowering plant in the family Fabaceae, that is found only in India.
It is threatened by habitat loss.

References

assamica
Flora of East Himalaya
Flora of Assam (region)
Vulnerable plants
Taxonomy articles created by Polbot